Roger William Howells (18 September 1931 – 1975) was a Welsh footballer who played as a centre forward in the Football League for Darlington and in non-league football for Llanelly. Either side of his spell with Darlington, he was on the books of Swansea Town without playing for them in the League. Howells played twice for Darlington's first team, both appearances coming in the Third Division North: in the last match of the 1953–54 Football League season, a 2–0 defeat at home to Halifax Town, and in September 1953, a 1–1 draw at home to Barnsley.

References

1931 births
1975 deaths
Footballers from Swansea
Welsh footballers
Association football forwards
Llanelli Town A.F.C. players
Swansea City A.F.C. players
Darlington F.C. players
English Football League players